Rhynocoris (historically often misspelled as "Rhinocoris") is a genus of assassin bug, family (Reduviidae), in the subfamily Harpactorinae.  Species are recorded from Asia, mainland Europe, Africa and North America.

Life history
Species of this genus are noted for providing parental care of offspring. Parental care is unusual in subsocial insects, having only evolved six times in the Heteroptera. R. tristis for example, is well known for guarding egg masses.

Rhynocoris kumarii is known to prey upon the larvae of Euproctis fraterna (Moore).

Species
BioLib lists the following:

 Rhynocoris abeillei (Puton, 1881)
 Rhynocoris abramovi (Oshanin, 1870)
 Rhynocoris albopilosus (Signoret, 1858)
 Rhynocoris albopunctatus (Stål, 1855)
 Rhynocoris amazulu Kirkaldy, 1859
 Rhynocoris analis (Jakovlev, 1889)
 Rhynocoris annulatus (Linnaeus, 1758)
 Rhynocoris aulicus (Stål, 1866)
 Rhynocoris barakensis Schouteden, 1929
 Rhynocoris bayoni (Jeannel, 1916)
 Rhynocoris beaumonti Villiers, 1966
 Rhynocoris bellicosus (Stål, 1858)
 Rhynocoris bequaerti Schouteden, 1913
 Rhynocoris bequaertianus Schouteden, 1929
 Rhynocoris bicolor (Fabricius, 1781)
 Rhynocoris bipustulatus (Fieber, 1861)
 Rhynocoris bituberculatus (Stål, 1858)
 Rhynocoris brincki Miller, 1956
 Rhynocoris calviventris (Germar, 1837)
 Rhynocoris cardinalis Miller, 1950
 Rhynocoris carmelita (Stål, 1859)
 Rhynocoris carvalhoi Villiers, 1958
 Rhynocoris castanescens (Jeannel, 1916)
 Rhynocoris christophi (Jakovlev, 1877)
 Rhynocoris cinctorius (Stål, 1865)
 Rhynocoris coiffaiti Villiers, 1967
 Rhynocoris congolensis Schouteden, 1932
 Rhynocoris costalis (Stal, 1867)
 Rhynocoris cruralis Bergroth, 1915
 Rhynocoris cuspidatus Ribaut, 1921
 Rhynocoris dasynotum Miller, 1950
 Rhynocoris dauricus Kiritshenko, 1926
 Rhynocoris decoratus Schouteden, 1929
 Rhynocoris discoidalis (Reuter, 1881)
 Rhynocoris donisi Villiers, 1973
 Rhynocoris dudae (Horváth, 1892)
 Rhynocoris dusmeti (Varela, 1905)
 Rhynocoris erythrocnemis (Germar, 1837)
 Rhynocoris erythropus (Linnaeus, 1767)
 Rhynocoris fasciculatus (Bergroth, 1895)
 Rhynocoris fimbriatus Miller, 1948
 Rhynocoris flavolimbatus (Jakovlev, 1889)
 Rhynocoris fuscipes (Fabricius, 1787)
 Rhynocoris ghesquierei Schouteden, 1929
 Rhynocoris gilviventris Bergroth, 1894
 Rhynocoris harmonia Linnavuori, 1989
 Rhynocoris hierapolitanus Dispons, 1964
 Rhynocoris horridus (de Carlini, 1895)
 Rhynocoris hovanus Kirkaldy, 1881
 Rhynocoris hutsebauti Schouteden, 1932
 Rhynocoris ibericus Kolenati, 1857
 Rhynocoris illotus Miller, 1941
 Rhynocoris imperialis (Stål, 1859)
 Rhynocoris incertis (Distant, 1903)
 Rhynocoris iracundus (Poda, 1761)
 Rhynocoris jeanneli Schouteden, 1932
 Rhynocoris kapangae Schouteden, 1952
 Rhynocoris kavirondo Jeannel, 1916
 Rhynocoris kedahensis Miller, 1941
 Rhynocoris kervillei Horváth, 1911
 Rhynocoris kiritshenkoi Popov, 1964
 Rhynocoris kumarii Ambrose & Livingstone, 1986
 Rhynocoris lapidicola Samuel & Joseph, 1953
 Rhynocoris leucospilus (Stål, 1859)
 Rhynocoris lineaticornis (Reuter, 1895)
 Rhynocoris linnavuorii Villiers, 1969
 Rhynocoris longifrons (Stål, 1874)
 Rhynocoris lotellus Miller, 1956
 Rhynocoris lotus Miller, 1956
 Rhynocoris mabirae Miller, 1954
 Rhynocoris machadoi Villiers, 1952
 Rhynocoris maeandrus Distant, 1909
 Rhynocoris marginatus (Fabricius, 1794)
 Rhynocoris marginellus (Fabricius, 1803)
 Rhynocoris maynei Schouteden, 1929
 Rhynocoris mendicus (Stal, 1867)
 Rhynocoris milvus Miller, 1948
 Rhynocoris mirachur Kiritschenko, 1913
 Rhynocoris modestus Schouteden, 1944
 Rhynocoris monachus Miller, 1941
 Rhynocoris monticola (Oshanin, 1870)
 Rhynocoris murati Villiers, 1948
 Rhynocoris neavei Bergroth, 1912
 Rhynocoris nebulosus Miller, 1950
 Rhynocoris nemoralis Miller, 1950
 Rhynocoris niasensis Miller, 1941
 Rhynocoris niger (Herrich-Schäffer, 1842)
 Rhynocoris nigronitens (Reuter, 1881)
 Rhynocoris nilgiriensis Distant, 1903
 Rhynocoris nitidulus (Fabricius, 1781)
 Rhynocoris nysiiphagus Samuel & Joseph, 1953
 Rhynocoris obtusus (Palisot de Beauvois, 1805)
 Rhynocoris ocreatus Dispons, 1964
 Rhynocoris oculata Benedek, 1969
 Rhynocoris odziensis Miller, 1950
 Rhynocoris otjimbumbensis Hesse, 1925
 Rhynocoris overlaeti Schouteden, 1929
 Rhynocoris parthiae China & Miller, 1950
 Rhynocoris persicus (Jakovlev, 1877)
 Rhynocoris pilipectus Hesse, 1925
 Rhynocoris pseudolatro Villiers, 1964
 Rhynocoris pulvisculatus (Distant, 1892)
 Rhynocoris pumilus (Jakovlev, 1877)
 Rhynocoris punctiventris (Herrich-Schaeffer, 1848)
 Rhynocoris pygmaeus (Distant, 1903)
 Rhynocoris rapax (Stål, 1855)
 Rhynocoris rathjensi Miller, 1954
 Rhynocoris reuteri (Distant, 1879)
 Rhynocoris rubricoxa (Bergroth, 1890)
 Rhynocoris rubricus (Germar, 1814)
 Rhynocoris rubrizonatus Miller, 1954
 Rhynocoris rubrogularis (Horváth, 1879)
 Rhynocoris rudebecki Miller, 1956
 Rhynocoris rufigenu (Fallou, 1891)
 Rhynocoris rufipes (Bolivar, 1879)
 Rhynocoris rufus (Thunberg, 1822)
 Rhynocoris saevus (Stål, 1865)
 Rhynocoris schoutedeni Villiers, 1948
 Rhynocoris segmentarius (Germar, 1837)
 Rhynocoris sericans (Reuter, 1881)
 Rhynocoris seyidiensis (Jeannel, 1916)
 Rhynocoris sordidulus (Oshanin, 1870)
 Rhynocoris squalus Distant, 1904
 Rhynocoris squamulosus Villiers, 1948
 Rhynocoris suspectus Schouteden, 1910
 Rhynocoris tavetanus (Jeannel, 1916)
 Rhynocoris transitus Hoberlandt, 1951
 Rhynocoris tristicolor (Reuter, 1881)
 Rhynocoris tristis (Stål, 1855)
 Rhynocoris trochantericus (Reuter, 1877)
 Rhynocoris tropicus (Herrich-Schaeffer, 1848)
 Rhynocoris vandenplasi Schouteden, 1932
 Rhynocoris varians (Paiva, 1918)
 Rhynocoris ventralis (Say, 1832)
 Rhynocoris venustus (Stål, 1855)
 Rhynocoris vicinus (Schouteden, 1910)
 Rhynocoris violentus (Germar, 1837)
 Rhynocoris vittiventris (Stål, 1859)
 Rhynocoris vulneratus (Germar, 1837)
 Rhynocoris vumbaensis Miller, 1950
 Rhynocoris witteanus Schouteden, 1944
 Rhynocoris wittei Schouteden, 1929
 Rhynocoris xosanus (Kirkaldy, 1909)
 Rhynocoris yambuyae (Distant, 1890)
 Rhynocoris zonogaster (de Carlini, 1895)

Gallery

References

Reduviidae
Articles containing video clips
Heteroptera genera